German submarine U-254 was a Type VIIC U-boat of Nazi Germany's Kriegsmarine, built for service in the Second World War and the Battle of the Atlantic. She was a mildly successful boat which carried out three war patrols, but fell victim to a freak accident during an attack on an Allied convoy in the mid-Atlantic Ocean on her third patrol and was lost.

Built in 1941 at Vegesack, U-254 was commanded for all her brief career by Kapitänleutnant Hans Gilardone, except for a brief period of illness, when Kptlt. Odo Loewe took command for her second patrol. She conducted her warm-up and training period in the Baltic Sea in the first half of 1942, before she was despatched to Kiel from where she participated in her first war operations.

Design
German Type VIIC submarines were preceded by the shorter Type VIIB submarines. U-254 had a displacement of  when at the surface and  while submerged. She had two shafts and two  propellers.

U-254 was fitted with five  torpedo tubes (four fitted at the bow and one at the stern), fourteen torpedoes, one  SK C/35 naval gun, 220 rounds, and two twin  C/30 anti-aircraft guns. The boat had a complement of between forty-four and sixty.

Service history

First patrol
Her first war patrol was a simple one, entailing a passage between Kiel and her new home base in Brest in occupied France. During this month-long journey, U-254 was ordered to spend sometime cruising off Reykjavík, Iceland, hoping to catch some stragglers from northern convoys or supply ships running to the Allied forces stationed on the island. She had one success, sinking a small British freighter on 2 August before she headed for her new home.

Second patrol
Her second patrol was more eventful, when on 3 October, after twelve days of cruising, she spotted the 11,237 GRT American tanker Esso Williamsburg in the central North Atlantic and sank her with one torpedo, killing 28. This was followed six days later by another success in a similar area, when the  British ship  was sunk by three torpedoes with all 45 crew on board.

The promising career of U-254 was almost cut short on this cruise, when the Norwegian   damaged her with depth charges during an attack on a convoy in the same area as her previous victories.

Third patrol
After repairs, U-254 departed in late November 1942, returning to her old operating grounds of the North Atlantic routes. In December, the weather in the region is atrocious and visibility practically nil, so as U-254 maneuvered to attack Convoy HX 217, to which she had been directed on 8 December, it is perhaps unsurprising that her crew failed to see  come steaming out of the gloom and straight into her broadside. The two submarines had become lost in the dark and collided with one another in a freak accident, which claimed 41 of U-254s crew, who were spilled into the ocean as the boat heeled over and sank. Sailors from U-221 dived into the turbulent sea tied to ropes, and succeeded in rescuing four bedraggled survivors of the sinking. U-221 was badly damaged. Unable to dive, Oberleutnant zur See Trojer aborted the patrol and returned to St. Nazaire, France.

Summary of raiding history

References

Bibliography

External links

German Type VIIC submarines
World War II shipwrecks in the Atlantic Ocean
World War II submarines of Germany
U-boats sunk in collisions
U-boats commissioned in 1941
1941 ships
U-boats sunk in 1942
Ships built in Bremen (state)
Maritime incidents in December 1942